Jayanth Sharma is an Indian wildlife photographer.

Life and work
Sharma was born on 6 May 1980 in Mysore to Nagaraja Sharma, a historian and photographer. He learned photography from his father. Prior to entering photography, Sharma worked in the information technology field.

He has photographed in Africa, Antarctica, Norway, and India. He has written about travel and photography for The Asian Age, Outlook India and Deccan Chronicle. In 2010, Sharma founded "Toehold", a photography and travel company that provides mentorship by photographers. In 2018, he partnered with Amazon India to take online photography classes under the program named "Shutterbug".

Awards
2018: DJ Memorial photography award, Wildlife category.

Gallery

References

External links

Indian wildlife photographers
Living people
21st-century Indian photographers
1980 births